The Essex Record Office is the repository for records about the county of Essex in England. The office is run by Essex County Council. A searchable database of the records held at the office is available on a system called Seax.

Selected publications
Brown, Arthur Frederick James. (1982) Chartism in Essex and Suffolk. 
Briggs, Nancy R. (1991) John Johnson, 1732-1814: Georgian Architect and County Surveyor of Essex, 
Ward, Jennifer C. (1991) The Essex Gentry and the County Community in the Fourteenth Century.  (Studies in Essex History)
Benham, Hervey. (1993) Essex Gold: Fortunes of the Essex Oysterman. 
Phillips, Andrew. (1998) Ten Men and Colchester. 
Hunter, John. (1999) The Essex Landscape: A Study of Its Form and History.

References

External links 
 Essex Record Office
 Essex Record Office blog

History of Essex
Essex County Council
County record offices in England